Winter Words may refer to:

 Winter Words (album), by All About Eve
 Winter Words (song cycle), by Benjamin Britten
 Winter Words in Various Moods and Metres, a poetry collection by Thomas Hardy, basis for Britten's song cycle